Engelbert Humperdinck (1 September 1854 – 27 September 1921) was a German composer. He is known widely for his opera Hansel and Gretel (1893).

Biography

Humperdinck was born at Siegburg in the Rhine Province in 1854. After receiving piano lessons, he produced his first composition at the age of seven. His first attempts at works for the stage were two singspiele written when he was 13. His parents disapproved of his plans for a career in music and encouraged him to study architecture.

But he began taking music classes under Ferdinand Hiller and Isidor Seiss at the Cologne Conservatory in 1872. In 1876, he won a scholarship that enabled him to go to Munich, where he studied with Franz Lachner and later with Josef Rheinberger. In 1879, he won the first Mendelssohn Award given by the Mendelssohn Stiftung (foundation) in Berlin.

He went to Italy, where he became acquainted with composer Richard Wagner in Naples. Wagner invited him to join him in Bayreuth, and during 1880 and 1881 Humperdinck assisted in the production of Parsifal. He also served as music tutor to Wagner's son, Siegfried.

After winning another prize, Humperdinck traveled through Italy, France, and Spain. For two years, he taught at the Gran Teatre del Liceu Conservatory in Barcelona. In 1887, he returned to Cologne. He was appointed professor at the Hoch Conservatory in Frankfurt in 1890 and also teacher of harmony at Julius Stockhausen's Vocal School. By this time he had composed several works for chorus and a Humoreske for small orchestra, which enjoyed a vogue in Germany.

Hänsel und Gretel

Humperdinck's reputation rests chiefly on his opera Hänsel und Gretel, on which he began work in Frankfurt in 1890. He first composed four songs to accompany a puppet show his nieces were giving at home. Then, using a libretto and thematic suggestions by his sister Adelheid Wette, rather loosely based on the version of the fairy tale by the Brothers Grimm, he composed a singspiel of 16 songs with piano accompaniment and connecting dialogue. By January 1891 he had begun working on a complete orchestration.

The opera premiered in Weimar on 23 December 1893, under the baton of Richard Strauss. With its highly original synthesis of Wagnerian techniques and traditional German folk songs, Hansel and Gretel was an instant and overwhelming success.

Hansel and Gretel has always been Humperdinck's most popular work. In 1923 the Royal Opera House (London) chose it for their first complete radio opera broadcast. Eight years later, it was the first opera transmitted live from the Metropolitan Opera (New York).

Later career

In 1896, Kaiser Wilhelm II made Humperdinck a Professor and he went to live at Boppard. Four years later, he went to Berlin, where he was appointed head of a Meister-Schule of composition. His students included Basque composer Andrés Isasi, Portuguese composer Luís de Freitas Branco and Kurt Weill.

Among Humperdinck's other stage works are:
Die sieben Geißlein (The Seven Little Kids), 1895
Königskinder (King's Children), 1897, 1910
Dornröschen (Sleeping Beauty), 1902
Die Heirat wider Willen (The Reluctant Marriage), 1905
Bübchens Weihnachtstraum (The Christmas Dream), 1906
Die Marketenderin (The Provisioner), 1914
Gaudeamus: Szenen aus dem deutschen Studentenleben (Gaudeamus igitur: Scenes from German Student Life), 1919

While composing those works, Humperdinck held various teaching positions of distinction. He also collaborated in the theater, providing incidental music for a number of Max Reinhardt's productions in Berlin: for example, Shakespeare's The Merchant of Venice in 1905.

Although recognized as a disciple of Wagner rather than an innovator, Humperdinck was the first composer to use Sprechgesang—a vocal technique halfway between singing and speaking—in his melodrama Königskinder (1897).

In 1914, Humperdinck is thought to have applied for the post of director of the Sydney Conservatorium of Music in Australia, but with the outbreak of World War I, it became unthinkable for a German to hold that position. Belgium's Henri Verbrugghen was selected for the job, as Belgium was an ally of the United Kingdom. Also in 1914, Humperdinck signed the Manifesto of the Ninety-Three, declaring support for German military actions during early World War I.

On 5 January 1912 Humperdinck suffered a severe stroke. Although he recovered, his left hand remained permanently paralyzed. He continued to compose, completing Gaudeamus with the help of his son, Wolfram, in 1918.

On 26 September 1921 Humperdinck attended a performance of Carl Maria von Weber's Der Freischütz in Neustrelitz, which was Wolfram's first effort as a stage director. He suffered a heart attack during the performance and died the next day from a second heart attack. The Berlin State Opera performed Hansel and Gretel in his memory a few weeks later.

Legacy

For a list of Humperdinck's pupils, see this list.

In 1965, British singer Arnold Dorsey named himself after the composer.

The main belt asteroid 9913 Humperdinck, discovered in 1977, was named after the composer.

References

External links 

 
 
 
 
  (contaminated with results for the singer)

1854 births
1921 deaths
19th-century classical composers
19th-century German composers
19th-century German male musicians
20th-century classical composers
20th-century German composers
20th-century German male musicians
Academic staff of the Conservatori Superior de Música del Liceu
German male classical composers
German opera composers
German Romantic composers
Hochschule für Musik und Tanz Köln alumni
Male opera composers
Mendelssohn Prize winners
People from Siegburg
People from the Rhine Province
Pupils of Josef Rheinberger